The Professional Picture Framers Association / PPFA is an international trade organization serving the art and framing community worldwide since 1971. Members include independent frame shop owners and staff, distributors and manufacturers of picture frame mouldings, supplies and equipment, art galleries, artists, and other businesses in the custom picture framing industry.

PPFA connects members to a network of knowledge and support, and offers education, an annual Convention, certification, competitions, marketing and business services, and member benefits.

The association is managed by Monarch Expositions.

Custom picture framers can find more information at https://www.PPFA.com

Consumers can learn more about custom framing, find expert advice, and search for local frame shops at https://www.PPFADirectory.com

History
 Incorporated on August 21, 1971 with offices in Richmond, Virginia established in 1973 
 The first PRINT Framing Competition was held in Burlingame, CA in 1971
 The first OPEN Framing Competition was held in New York, NY in 1975
 Launched the Certified Picture Framer certification program in 1986 
 Became part of the Photo Marketing Association (PMA) in 2001 
 Launched the Master Certified Picture Framer certification program in 2003 
 Monarch Exhibitions purchased PPFA in July 2015

Certification
PPFA offers two levels of certification:

   Certified Picture Framer (CPF):

Any picture framer who has a minimum of one year of hands-on experience in retail or wholesale picture framing may apply for the certification. A person who passes the written/multiple choice exam, available online and the annual Convention, will receive the designation of Certified Picture Framer (CPF®). Visit the PPFA Website for more information https://www.PPFA.com

   Master Certified Picture Framer (MCPF)

A framer who has been a professional framer for five years, has passed the Certified Picture Framer (CPF) Exam, and has taken a Re-certification Course, is eligible to advance and earn the prestigious Master Certified Picture Framer (MCPF) designation, by a hands-on examination.  Visit the PPFA Website for more information https://www.PPFA.com

There are currently only about 70 Master Certified Picture Framers in the world.

PPFA offers a Scholarship to Members ready to earn either the CPF or MCPF Designation. Visit the PPFA Bookstore for more information https://ppfa.z2systems.com/np/clients/ppfa/giftstore.jsp?actionType=search&keyword=scholarship&catalogSearch=true

Re-certification courses and Continuing Education classes are offered at the Annual Convention.

The designations Certified Picture Framer, CPF and MCPF are all registered trademarks in the United States.

Publications
PPFA publishes the Guidelines for Framing Paintings on Canvas; Guidelines for Framing Works of Art on Paper; and Guidelines for Framing Textiles and Needleart;  PPFA Comparative Standards for Matboard; PPFA Comparative Guidelines for Glazing; and the PPFA Art and Framing Glossary of Standard Terms.  These publications, and many others as well as PPFA merchandise, are available in the PPFA online store. https://ppfa.z2systems.com/np/clients/ppfa/giftstore.jsp

Annual Convention
The association has an annual convention each January in Las Vegas, Nevada at the West Coast Art & Frame Expo/The National Conference. The event includes the finals of the PPFA international PRINT and OPEN framing competition; PPFA education; certification exams and courses; and special events such as a keynote speaker and welcome reception.

PPFA Framers Corner Online Forum
PPFA hosts The Framers’ Corner Online forum  https://www.PPFACorner.com where custom framers can network with framers around the world, get technical assistance, share design ideas, get business and marketing tips, and more

See also
 Gallery wrap
 Mat (picture framing)
 Fillet (picture framing)
 Gilding
 Gold leaf
 Silver leaf (art)
 Picture framing glass
 Picture frame

References

External links 
 Professional Picture Framers Association website
 Preservation Guidelines for Matting and Framing- U.S. Library of Congress

Picture framing
Art and design-related professional associations
Professional associations based in the United States
International professional associations
Trade associations based in the United States
Organizations established in 1971
1971 establishments in the United States